These are the full results of the 1997 European Cup Super League in athletics which was held on 21 and 22 June 1997 at the Olympic Stadium in Munich, Germany.

Team standings

Men's results

100 metres
21 JuneWind: +0.2 m/s

200 metres
22 JuneWind: +0.7 m/s

400 metres
21 June

800 metres
22 June

1500 metres
21 June

3000 metres
21 June

5000 metres
22 June

110 metres hurdles
22 JuneWind: +0.2 m/s

400 metres hurdles
21 June

3000 metres steeplechase
22 June

4 × 100 metres relay
21 June

4 × 400 metres relay
21 June

High jump
21 June

Pole vault
22 June (held indoors)

Long jump
21 June

Triple jump
22 June

Shot put
21 June

Discus throw
22 June

Hammer throw
21 June

Javelin throw
22 June

Women's results

100 metres
21 JuneWind: +0.6 m/s

200 metres
22 JuneWind: -0.2 m/s

400 metres
21 June

800 metres
21 June

1500 metres
22 June

3000 metres
22 June

5000 metres
21 June

100 metres hurdles
22 JuneWind: +0.7 m/s

400 metres hurdles
21 June

4 × 100 metres relay
21 June

4 × 400 metres relay
22 June

High jump
22 June

Pole vault
21 June

Long jump
22 June

Triple jump
21 June

Shot put
22 June

Discus throw
21 June

Hammer throw
22 June

Javelin throw
21 June

References

European Cup Super League
European
1997 in German sport
International athletics competitions hosted by Germany
Sports competitions in Munich